Salakinkoppa is a village in Dharwad district of Karnataka, India.

Demographics 
As of the 2011 Census of India there were 268 households in Salakinkoppa and a total population of 1,433 consisting of 728 males and 705 females. There were 177 children ages 0-6.

References

Villages in Dharwad district